Oreste Squinobal (17 December 1942 – 9 September 2004), from Gressoney-Saint-Jean, was an Italian mountain climber, mountain guide  of Monte Rosa and ski mountaineer.

Together with his brother Arturo he made his first winter ascent of the South Face of Matterhorn (23 December 1971), the first winter ascent of the Peuterey Integral (26 December 1972, together with Yannick Seigneur, Michel Feuillarade, Marc Galy, and Louis Audoubert), and the first winter ascent of the West Face of Matterhorn (11 January 1978, together with Rolando Albertini, Marco Barmasse, Innocenzo Menabreaz, Leo Pession, Augusto Tamone).

Together with his brothers Arturo and Lorenzo, he placed first in the mountain guides team category in the 1975 Trofeo Mezzalama edition, which was carried out as the first World Championship of Skimountaineering.

On May 2, 1982, he was the first Italian to climb to the summit of the Kangchenjunga (8,586 meters) without supplemental oxygen.

Oreste and Arturo Squinobal's story is told in Brothers of the Mountains.

References

1943 births
2004 deaths
Italian mountain climbers
Italian male ski mountaineers
World ski mountaineering champions
People from Gressoney-Saint-Jean
Alpine guides
Sportspeople from Aosta Valley